Magdalenasaura is a newly described genus of lizards in the family Gymnophthalmidae. The genus is exclusively endemic to the Cordillera Central in Colombia.

Species
The genus Magdalenasaura contains two species: M. adercum and M. leurosquama.

References

Magdalenasaura
Reptiles of Colombia
Endemic fauna of Colombia
Reptiles described in 2020
Lizard genera